Hawkins is a locality in Alberta, Canada.

Hawkins has the name of a railroad official.

References 

Localities in the Municipal District of Wainwright No. 61